Sidi Elchahmi is a town and commune in Oran Province, Algeria. In 1998, it has a population of 58,857.

References

Communes of Oran Province